Kilcoole Church, also called Old Kilcoole Church, is a medieval church and National Monument in Kilcoole, County Wicklow, Ireland.

Location

At 6°03′46″W, it is the easternmost of the Republic of Ireland's National Monuments.

History

The church derives its name from a Saint Comgall (not the famous Comgall of Bangor). The church was built in the 12th century and was dedicated to Mary, mother of Jesus.

Thady Byrne of Ballygannon, a senior member of the O'Byrne family, was buried at Kilcoole Church in 1707.

Church
The church is a nave and chancel structure. The chancel probably once had a step-pitched stone roof, with a small attic roof over the chancel. The nave has a square baptismal font, a cross slab and a small round-headed window in the south wall.

The west part of the church was added later as a two-storey living quarters.

References

Churches in County Wicklow
Archaeological sites in County Wicklow
National Monuments in County Wicklow
Former churches in the Republic of Ireland